Blue Moves is the eleventh studio album by English musician Elton John. It was released in October 1976. It was John's second double album (after Goodbye Yellow Brick Road) and the first to be released by his own label, Rocket Records Ltd. The album reached number 3 in the US charts, ending a long streak of chart-topping albums for John that began with Honky Château in 1972.

Background
Having completed what he described as a "gruelling American tour", John gave only a handful of performances at the time of release, and later announced (during a charity concert at Wembley Arena the following year), "I haven't been touring for a long time. It's been a painful decision, whether to come back on the road or not... I've made a decision tonight – this is going to be the last show... There's a lot more to me than playing on the road." He accordingly left the touring/live performing scene for a brief period. Kenny Passarelli, Caleb Quaye, James Newton Howard and Roger Pope played their last shows together as part of the Elton John Band during John's seven-night engagement at Madison Square Garden at the conclusion of the Louder Than Concorde Tour, and formally were let go from the band after the album's release. The shows were the last time Pope, Passarelli, Quaye and John played together. Howard would briefly rejoin John's touring band in 1980, and work with him on the 1986 Tour De Force Tour shows in Australia and New Zealand. Only Davey Johnstone and Ray Cooper returned for roles on John's next album, A Single Man and beyond.

John has stated that Blue Moves is one of his favourites of the albums he has recorded. It was the last album Gus Dudgeon produced with John for almost a decade until 1985's Ice on Fire. The cover art is from a painting by British artist Patrick Procktor, called "The Guardian Readers". In the U.S., it was certified gold in October and platinum in December 1976 by the RIAA.

"Cage the Songbird" was a tribute to legendary French songstress Edith Piaf, and a year or so later was covered by Kiki Dee on an unreleased Rocket album, which finally was issued in 2008. ("Songbird" originated as part of the Rock of the Westies sessions, but was not completed during them, probably because the song's acoustic, delicate sound did not fit with the more rock 'n' roll approach of the rest of the songs that made the Westies final track list.) The Beach Boys turned down "Chameleon" (which was written two years prior to the album's release), but Bruce Johnston, a former Beach Boy, performed backing vocals on John's version along with former Beach Boys touring member Toni Tennille. John also performed the song at Wembley Stadium in 1975, where he also performed the Captain Fantastic and the Brown Dirt Cowboy album in its entirety. An excerpt from "Out of the Blue" was used for the closing titles on Top Gear until the end of that Top Gear format (in 2001). This was one of two albums in which Davey Johnstone does not provide backing vocals; 1997's The Big Picture would be the other.

Basic tracks for Blue Moves were recorded at Eastern Sound in Toronto, Ontario. Additional overdubs were done at EMI Studios, Abbey Road in London, Brother Studio in Santa Monica, California and Sunset Sound in Los Angeles, California. The album was mixed at Marquee Studios in London.

John has played several songs from Blue Moves live: "Sorry Seems to Be the Hardest Word", "Bite Your Lip", "One Horse Town", "Tonight", "Idol" and "Crazy Water" have been played during various concert appearances through the years.

In the summer of 2011, George Michael embarked on what would be his final tour, an orchestral tour of Europe, the UK, and Australia. From the 19 September concert at Budapest Sports Arena, Michael performed "Idol" replacing "It Doesn't Really Matter". At a special gig in the Royal Albert Hall raising money for the Elton John AIDS Foundation, Michael introduced the song, saying: "This next song was written by someone I hope has made it in here already – Elton. It's a song he wrote in the late 70s and it's about an ageing pop star. Funny that." As Michael cast his gaze around the audience, John waved from the stalls, where he sat beside his civil partner David Furnish and broadcaster Janet Street Porter. Having already recorded his own version of "Tonight" for the Two Rooms album in 1991, Michael's vocals at that concert ended up on 2014's Symphonica.

Reception

Blue Moves has received mixed reviews since its release. A contemporary review for Rolling Stone said the album "contains nowhere near enough good songs to justify the extended length" and that the interludes and instrumentals were done "to the exclusion of sense." Village Voice critic Robert Christgau described it as "impossibly weepy" and "excessive". Lindsay Planer of Allmusic later said the album showed the "inevitable fatigue" of John's "immense creativity" that had helped create the previous albums of his career.

Track listing
 

Notes
 Initial CD versions of the album maintain the same running order, but omit the following tracks: Shoulder Holster, The Wide Eyed and Laughing,and Out of the Blue, It has since been remastered and re-released as a 2-CD set retaining the original LP track listing.

Personnel 
Track numbering refers to the 2-CD and digital releases of the album.
 Elton John – acoustic piano (1–5, 7–10, 13–16, 18), vocals (2–9, 12–16, 18), vocalese (11), harmonium (14), harpsichord (17)
 Curt Becher – backing vocals (4, 10, 11, 13), BGV arrangements (11, 13)
 Harry Bluestone – strings leader (18)
 Michael Brecker – saxophone (5, 8, 16)
 Randy Brecker – trumpet (5, 8, 16)
 Paul Buckmaster – string arrangements and conductor (3, 7, 15), brass arrangements (7)
 Cindy Bullens – backing vocals (4, 7, 11)
 Clark Burroughs – backing vocals (13)
 Joe Chemay – backing vocals (11, 13)
 Rev. James Cleveland – choir director (5, 14, 18)
 Ray Cooper – glockenspiel (1, 17), marimba (1, 17), gong (3), tambourine (3, 5, 7, 8, 11, 15), vibraphone (3, 4, 9, 10), bells (3), shaker (4, 6, 11), triangle (6), finger cymbals (6), congas (7, 10, 11, 15, 18), rototom (12)
 The Cornerstone Institutional Baptist Church and the Southern California Community Choir – choirs (5, 14, 18)
 David Crosby – backing vocals (6, 12)
 Daryl Dragon – BGV arrangements (7)
 The Martyn Ford Orchestra – strings (3, 7, 15), brass (7)
 Carl Fortina – accordion (8)
 Ron Hicklin – backing vocals (4, 7)
 Michael Hurwitz – cello (3)
 Bruce Johnston – backing vocals (4, 7, 10, 11, 13), BGV arrangements (4, 11, 13)
 Davey Johnstone – mandolin (2, 11, 17), electric guitar (3, 7, 10, 15), slide guitar (5, 18), acoustic guitar (6), dulcimer (6), sitar (12), slide guitar (18)
 Jon Joyce – backing vocals (4, 7, 11)
 The London Symphony Orchestra – strings (2, 9)
 Gene Morford – backing vocals (4, 7)
 Graham Nash – backing vocals (6, 12)
 James Newton Howard – synthesizers (1, 3, 6, 10, 12, 13, 17, 18), Fender Rhodes (3, 9, 13, 17), Hammond organ (5, 11, 15), mellotron (6), clavinet (7)
 The Gene Page Strings – strings (18)
 Kenny Passarelli – bass guitar (1, 3–5, 7–11, 14–18)
 Roger Pope – drums (1, 3–5, 7, 8, 10, 11, 15–18)
 Caleb Quaye – acoustic guitar (1, 4, 6, 12, 17), electric guitar (3, 4, 7, 10, 11, 15, 18), guitar solo (3, 10, 15), 12-string guitar (12)
 Barry Rogers – trombone (5, 8, 16)
 David Sanborn – saxophone (5, 8, 16)
 Richard Studt – strings leader (3, 7, 12, 15), brass leader (7)
 Toni Tennille – backing vocals (4, 7, 10, 13)

Production 
 Producer and Liner Notes  – Gus Dudgeon
 Engineers – Arun Chakraverty, Gus Dudgeon, Mark Howlett, John Kurlander, Earle Mankey and John Stewart.
 Mixing – Phil Dunne
 Remixing – Gus Dudgeon and Phil Dunne
 Cutting Engineer – Arun Chakraverty
 Art Direction and Coordination – David Costa
 Photography – David Nutter
 Painting – Patrick Procktor
 Management – John Reid

Charts

Weekly charts

Year-end charts

Certifications

References

External links

Elton John albums
1976 albums
Albums arranged by Paul Buckmaster
Albums produced by Gus Dudgeon
The Rocket Record Company albums
MCA Records albums
Albums recorded at Sunset Sound Recorders